RIP (abbreviating rest in peace, or ) is a common element of Christian epitaphs.

RIP may also refer to:

Arts, entertainment, and media

Music 
 RIP (band), punk band from Basque Country (Spain)
 R.I.P. or R.I.P. Productions, an alias of the UK garage duo Double 99

Albums 
 R.I.P. (Actress album)
 R.I.P. (Coroner album) (1987; thrash metal)
 R.I.P. (Murder City Devils album) (2003; live)
 R.I.P. (Rocket from the Crypt album)
 R.I.P. (The Zombies album)

Songs 
 "R.I.P." (Rita Ora song)
 "R.I.P." (Sofía Reyes song)
 "R.I.P." (Young Jeezy song)
 "R.I.P. (Rock in Peace)", on the album Backtracks
 "R.I.P. (Rest in Pain)",  by Sepultura from 1987 album Schizophrenia
 "R.I.P." (2007), by September on album Dancing Shoes
 "R.I.P." (2019), by Brooke Candy featuring Ashnikko from the album Sexorcism
 "RIP" (2017), by Olivia O'Brien
 "R.I.P." (2018), by Playboi Carti from the album Die Lit

Other uses in arts, entertainment, and media 
 "R.I.P." (story) (1998), by Poppy Z. Brite
 RiP!: A Remix Manifesto (2008), open-source documentary film

Biology
 Repeat-induced point mutation, a process by which DNA in some fungi accumulates mutations
 Ribosome-inactivating protein, a type of protein that controls ribosomes
 RNA immunoprecipitation, with an antibody

Computing
 Raster image processor
 Relative Instruction-Pointer, a processor register for holding an instruction pointer in the x86-64 architecture
 Remote Imaging Protocol, for using graphics instead of text on a BBS
 Routing Information Protocol, in computer networks

Other uses
 Ranger Indoctrination Program, U.S. Army
 Reduced ignition propensity cigarette 
 Regulation of Investigatory Powers Act 2000, a UK act of Parliament
 Restricted isometry property, in mathematics
 R.I.P. cartridge (Round, Irritant, Personnel), or tear-gas cartridge, a specialist shotgun ammunition
 RIP Medical Debt, American charity

See also
 Rip (disambiguation)